Stefán Gíslason (born 15 March 1980 in Fjarðabyggð) is an Icelandic retired footballer and manager who last played for Breiðablik in the Icelandic Premier League as a defensive midfielder. He is currently managing Søgne in the Norwegian Fourth Division.

As a player, Gíslason was renowned for coupling physical power with great technique and is the younger brother of fellow international player Valur Gíslason. In 2017, Gíslason starting his career as manager at Haukar, where he resigned at the end of the season.

Club career
As a youngster he was on the roster of English giants Arsenal, but limited playing time saw him returning to KR Reykjavík on a loan deal. He later played for Strømsgodset, Grazer AK and Keflavík before joining Lyn in 2005. Stefán immediately made an impression, and was eventually made vice captain. While at Lyn he played 62 league games out of a possible 65, scoring eight goals.

He was sold to Brøndby in July 2007 and in February 2008 replaced Per Nielsen as captain. On 3 July 2009 Stefán was informed that he would no longer captain the side and that he would be free to leave the club at the end of the season. In recent time, Stefán has been linked to the Norwegian club Viking FK, were the former Norwegian national team coach Åge Hareide is coaching. He played on loan for Viking in early 2010.

His situation in Brøndby had not become better, resulting in Stefán wishing to leave the club in the next transfer season. On 4 February 2011, Brøndby and Stefán agreed to cancel his contract with the club with immediate effect. The timing of that release effectively leaves Stefán in limbo because other clubs are unable to sign him until the summer of 2011 due to the transfer window rules. Aberdeen manager Craig Brown stated on 21 February that he had been interested in signing Stefán until it was discovered he was ineligible to sign. On 16 March 2011, Stefán was presented as the main event at the seasonal kick-off of Lillestrøm SK, signing a contract expiring on 1 August. However, after enduring a terrible run of five goalless losses, Lillestrøm decided to bring him back 29 September for the remainder of the 2011 season. On 10 January 2012, he signed for Belgian team Oud-Heverlee Leuven.

In February 2014, Stefán signed a 3-year contract with Icelandic club Breiðablik. However, on 13 February 2015, he announced his retirement from professional football.

Managerial career 
In 2017, Stefán was appointed the manager of Haukar

Career statistics

International career
Gíslason made his debut for Iceland in a January 2002 friendly match against Kuwait as a substitute for Helgi Sigurðsson. He has in total been capped 32 times for the Icelandic national team.

References

External links
Lyn profile 

1980 births
Living people
Stefan Gislason
Stefan Gislason
Stefan Gislason
Stefan Gislason
Arsenal F.C. players
Stefan Gislason
Strømsgodset Toppfotball players
Grazer AK players
Stefan Gislason
Lyn Fotball players
Brøndby IF players
Danish Superliga players
Belgian Pro League players
Oud-Heverlee Leuven players
Stefan Gislason
Eliteserien players
Norwegian First Division players
Austrian Football Bundesliga players
Stefan Gislason
Expatriate footballers in England
Stefan Gislason
Expatriate footballers in Norway
Stefan Gislason
Expatriate footballers in Austria
Stefan Gislason
Expatriate men's footballers in Denmark
Stefan Gislason
Expatriate footballers in Belgium
Stefan Gislason
Association football midfielders
Stefan Gislason
Stefan Gislason
Lommel S.K. managers